Olcan Adın (born 30 September 1985) is a retired Turkish professional footballer who played as a left back or winger.

Club career
Olcan started his career for Fenerbahçe, where he played 18 times and scored three goals for the youth team, before transferring to Gaziantepspor in the 2008–09 season for three years and later to Trabzonspor in 2012.

On 28 November 2013, Olcan was the hat-trick hero of the UEFA Europa League match against Apollon Limassol. His three goals and assist helped Trabzonspor to win over Cypriot side and qualify for the knockout stage of the UEFA Europa League.

Galatasaray
On 5 July 2014, Olcan signed a four-year contract with Galatasaray, for an €4M fee. He scored his first goal in the first game of the season against Bursaspor in a 2-0 away win. He became a left-back in Galatasaray, especially after Lionel Carole's injury and Alex Telles' loaning to Internazionale. On 25 October 2015, Olcan scored a head goal against Fenerbahçe in Süper Lig, also in a rivalry match, which ended 1–1 draw.

Akhisarspor
On 8 December 2016, Olcan Adın joined Akhisarspor on a 1.5 year contract. In his first season with the club, Olcan scored 5 goals and got 8 assists in 16 league appearances.

He scored against his former club Galatasaray at the Türk Telekom Stadium on 9 December 2017, with a long-range strike from 35 metres. Adın started the match, and played 90 minutes in a match Akhisarspor went on to lose 2–4, after leading 2–0 at half-time. On 10 May 2018, Olcan helped Akhisarspor win their first professional trophy, the 2017–18 Turkish Cup.

International career
On 1 March 2012, Olcan played his first international match for Turkey, against Slovakia. In a friendly match against Sweden on 5 March 2014, he scored the deciding goal coming on as a substitute in a 2-1 win.

Career statistics
.

Club

International goals
Scores and results table. Turkey's goal tally first:

Honours
Fenerbahçe
Süper Lig (2): 2003–04, 2006–07

Galatasaray S.K.
 Süper Lig (1): 2014–15
 Türkiye Kupası (2): 2014–15, 2015–16
 Süper Kupa (1): 2015

Akhisarspor
 Turkish Cup (1): 2017–18

References

External links

Profile at TFF.org 
 
 
 
 

1985 births
Living people
Sportspeople from Balıkesir
Turkish footballers
Turkey international footballers
Turkey under-21 international footballers
Turkey youth international footballers
Balıkesirspor footballers
Kartalspor footballers
Fenerbahçe S.K. footballers
Antalyaspor footballers
Karşıyaka S.K. footballers
Gaziantepspor footballers
Trabzonspor footballers
Galatasaray S.K. footballers
Akhisarspor footballers
Süper Lig players
Association football midfielders